The Scamander class sailing frigates were a series of ten 36-gun ships, all built by contract with private shipbuilders to an 1812 design by Sir William Rule, which served in the Royal Navy during the late Napoleonic War and War of 1812.

They were all built of "fir" (actually, pine), selected as a stop-gap measure because of the urgent need to build ships quickly, with the Navy Board supplying red pine timber to the contractors from dockyard stocks for the first seven ships. The last three were built of yellow pine. While quick to build, the material was not expected to last as long as oak-built ships, and indeed all were deleted by 1819, except the Tagus which lasted to 1822.

Ships in class 

Red pine group. These seven ships were originally ordered under the names Liffey, Brilliant, Lively, Severn, Blonde, Forth and Greyhound, all being renamed on 11 December 1812 (except Liffey and Severn, which were renamed on 26 January 1813).
  (ex-Liffey)
 Builder: Mrs Mary Ross, Rochester
 Ordered: 4 May 1812
 Laid down: August 1812
 Launched: 1 May 1813
 Completed: 13 July 1813 at Chatham Dockyard
 Fate: Sold 29 January 1818
  (ex-Brilliant)
 Builder: Josiah & Thomas Brindley, Frindsbury
 Ordered: 4 May 1812
 Laid down: August 1812
 Launched: 29 June 1813
 Completed: 13 December 1813 at Chatham Dockyard
 Fate: Broken up at Sheerness in April 1817
  (ex-Lively)
 Builder: Josiah & Thomas Brindley, Frindsbury
 Ordered: 4 May 1812
 Laid down: August 1812
 Launched: 13 July 1813
 Completed: 24 December 1813 at Chatham Dockyard
 Fate: Sold 22 July 1819
 HMS Tagus (ex-Severn)
 Builder: Daniel List, Binstead, Isle of Wight
 Ordered: 4 May 1812
 Laid down: August 1812
 Launched: 14 July 1813
 Completed: 9 November 1813 at Portsmouth Dockyard
 Fate: Sold 19 April 1822
  (ex-Blonde)
 Builder: William Wallis, Leamouth
 Ordered: 4 May 1812
 Laid down: August 1812
 Launched: 14 July 1813
 Completed: 11 November 1813 at Woolwich Dockyard
 Fate: Sold 8 March 1819
  (ex-Forth)
 Builder: John Pelham, Frindsbury, Kent
 Ordered: 4 May 1812
 Laid down: September 1812
 Launched: 26 June 1813
 Completed: 24 December 1813 at Chatham Dockyard
 Fate: Sold 11 June 1818
  (ex-Greyhound)
 Builder: John King, Upnor, Kent
 Ordered: 12 October 1812
 Laid down: January 1813
 Launched: 8 November 1813
 Completed: 24 September 1814 at Chatham Dockyard
 Fate: Sold 29 January 1818

Yellow pine group.
 
 Builder: John Barton, Limehouse
 Ordered: 16 November 1812
 Laid down: January 1813
 Launched: 13 September 1813
 Completed: 18 December 1813 at Deptford Dockyard
 Fate: Sold 3 April 1817
 
 Builder: John Barton, Limehouse
 Ordered: 17 November 1812
 Laid down: January 1813
 Launched: 25 October 1813
 Completed: 31 January 1814 at Deptford Dockyard
 Fate: Sold 3 April 1817
 
 Builder: William Wallis, Leamouth
 Ordered: 7 December 1812
 Laid down: July 1813
 Launched: 6 April 1814
 Completed: 11 July 1814 at Woolwich Dockyard
 Fate: Sold 10 September 1817

References
 Rif Winfield, British Warships in the Age of Sail, 1793-1817, 2nd edition, Seaforth Publishing, Barnsley 2008. .

 
Ship classes of the Royal Navy